Egon Solymossy (May 18, 1922 – September 24, 2009) was a Hungarian sprint athlete who competed in late 1940s and early 1950s. At the 1952 Summer Olympics in Helsinki, he was eliminated in the first round of both the 400 m and 4 × 400 m relay events. He was born in Miskolc.

References
Bama.hu 24 September 2009 announcement of Solymossy's death.  - accessed 27 September 2009.
Sports-Reference.com profile

1922 births
2009 deaths
Athletes (track and field) at the 1952 Summer Olympics
Hungarian male sprinters
Olympic athletes of Hungary
Sportspeople from Miskolc